Donyell Malen (born 19 January 1999) is a Dutch professional footballer who plays as a forward for Bundesliga club Borussia Dortmund and the Netherlands national team. Malen has also featured at youth level for Ajax and Arsenal.

Club career

Early career
Born in Wieringen, Hollands Kroon, Malen began his career with Ajax in 2007. Despite a great deal of resistance coming from Ajax, in 2015 he left Ajax to join English club Arsenal. Malen joined up due to Arsenal being the side of his heroes Thierry Henry and Dennis Bergkamp.

Arsenal

Malen began playing for the youth teams of Arsenal in the Youth Premier League together with the FA Youth Cup, and the UEFA Youth League in the 2015–16 season. He began to display his impressive talent during his debut season for the Gunners. He scored in the FA Youth Cup quarter-final away to Coventry City which Arsenal won on penalties. Coming off the bench, he scored against Manchester City in the semi-final of the 2016 FA Youth Cup at the Emirates Stadium. and played 30 times during the season, scoring 14 goals. During the 2016–17 season, Malen was used a great deal on the wing, and was included in the club's 2017–18 pre-season tour of Australia and China. He made his senior debut for Arsenal in a 2–0 win over Sydney on 13 July.

PSV
Malen was sold by Arsenal to PSV Eindhoven in late August 2017.

Malen went on to play as a winger for Jong PSV. On 24 November Malen scored a brace in Jong PSV's 6–0 thumping of Telstar. He again netted in PSV II's 3–0 win over FC Oss on 27 November. Malen scored and picked up an assist in PSV II's 2–3 loss to Fortuna upon 4 December.
He again scored in a 1–1 draw away to Go Ahead Eagles on 12 December. Malen went on to be named in Voetbal International's Jupiler League team of the week a day later.

Malen was awarded the Bronze Bull for being the Best Talent for the second period of the 2017–18 Jupiler League on 29 January 2018. He went to make his debut for PSV in a 4–0 Eredivisie win over PEC Zwolle on 3 February.
Malen went on to win the 2018 Eredivisie title with PSV. He also ended the 2017–18 season as Jong PSV's topscorer.

On 14 September 2019, Malen scored all 5 goals for PSV as they thrashed Vitesse. On 29 October 2020, he scored a brace in a 2–1 away win over AC Omonia in the 2020–21 UEFA Europa League. Malen had his most productive campaign for PSV during the 2020–21 season, scoring 19 goals in 32 matches as his club finished second in the Eredivisie. He added a further 8 goals across Europa League and KNVB Cup competition and he also registered 10 assists, displaying his characteristics as a multi-faceted forward.

Borussia Dortmund
On 27 July 2021, Malen completed a move to Bundesliga club Borussia Dortmund, signing a five-year deal.

International career

Youth

Born in the Netherlands, Malen is of Surinamese descent. At the 2016 Under 17 Euros held in Azerbaijan, Malen played throughout the tournament where the Oranje got to the semi finals. He went on to feature for the Netherlands under-18 team. He also was called up, in December 2016, for the Dutch squad for the 2017 UEFA European Under-19 Championship In March 2017 Malen scored in the 86th minute of an U18 game against Austria to equalise for the Dutch in an eventual 1–1 draw.

He was part of the Dutch squad which took part in a four-team tournament, scoring a 90th-minute equaliser against Portugal and then scored a brace in a 9–0 rout of Finland.
During an U19 Euro qualifier on 7 October, Malen netted for Netherlands's U19s to cap off a 2–0 victory at home against Hungary.  Malen two days later scored in extra time to secure a 2–2 draw with Slovenia, meaning Netherlands finished top of the group and qualified for the 2018 U19 Euros.
With the score locked at 1–1 in a friendly against Italy U19's, Malen hit a free kick to score the winning goal on 9 November. Malen then scored a brace for the Netherlands in a friendly away to Serbia U19's.

Senior
Malen made his senior international debut for the Netherlands on 6 September 2019, in a UEFA Euro 2020 qualifier against Germany in Hamburg. He came off the bench in the 58th minute and scored his team's third goal in a 4–2 victory.

Style of play
Malen is a tremendously quick player who possesses great dribbling skills and an aptitude for prolific goal scoring. Malen has been likened by ex-Ajax youth coach Brian Tevreden to Chilean forward Alexis Sánchez.

Career statistics

Club

International

Scores and results list the Netherlands' goal tally first, score column indicates score after each Malen goal.

Honours
PSV
Eredivisie: 2017–18

Individual
Bronze Bull: 2017–18 Jupiler League
 Eredivisie Player of the Month: September 2019; February 2021

References

External links

 Profile at the Borussia Dortmund website
 
 
 
 Donyell Malen at Eurosport
 
 Donyell Malen at OnsOranje 

1999 births
Living people
People from Wieringen
Association football forwards
Dutch footballers
Dutch sportspeople of Surinamese descent
Netherlands youth international footballers
Netherlands under-21 international footballers
Netherlands international footballers
AFC Ajax players
Arsenal F.C. players
Jong PSV players
PSV Eindhoven players
Borussia Dortmund players
Eredivisie players
Eerste Divisie players
Bundesliga players
UEFA Euro 2020 players
Dutch expatriate footballers
Dutch expatriate sportspeople in England
Expatriate footballers in England
Expatriate footballers in Germany
Footballers from North Holland